Needham Township was one of nine townships in Johnson County, Indiana. As of the 2010 census, its population was 6,511 and it contained 2,613 housing units.

As of January 1, 2022, Franklin, Union, and Needham townships were merged into a single entity known as Franklin-Union-Needham Township ("FUN").

Needham Township was formed in 1881.

Geography

References

External links
 Indiana Township Association
 United Township Association of Indiana

Townships in Johnson County, Indiana
Townships in Indiana